Sri Vaithya Lingam Swami temple is a Hindu temple dedicated to sri vaithya lingam swami and goddess yogambigai. It is located at Aladipatti,in Virudhunagar district of Tamil Nadu. The other deities of the temple are Sudalai Madan Samy and Karuppa Samy.

Kula Deivam
Sri Vaithya Lingam Swami is worshipped as Kula Deivam by various groups.

Festivals
The festival is celebrated twice a year. A ten day event is held for Sri Vaithya lingam swami and Yogambigai in Avani (Tamil month), while another festive is in Chithirai (Tamil month), which is more popular. In its 11 days the deity's idol is taken out in a procession on the four car street, the devotees whose homes fall on the way make offerings.

References

Hindu temples in Tirunelveli district